Storer House is a Frank Lloyd Wright house in the Hollywood Hills of Los Angeles built in 1923. The structure is noteworthy as one of the four Mayan Revival style textile-block houses built by Wright in the Los Angeles area from 1922 to 1924.

Design of Storer House
The Storer House was built in 1923 for Dr. John Storer, a homeopathic physician. Wright used the textile-block motif to "fit" the home into the hillside, trying to create the impression that the home was "a man-made extension of the landscape." However, Wright biographer Brendan Gill described the Storer House as a disappointment on this score: "In direct contradiction to everything that Wright had earlier preached about the natural, nearly invisible joining of structure and site, the Storer House, small as it is, asserts its presence with a surprising degree of arrogance—an arrogance far more obvious in the 1920s, when the hillside lacked the softening effect of foliage, than it is today."

The house is dominated by a large upstairs living room with a high ceiling, Mayan inspired columns, and tall narrow windows; the living room is the front facade facing the street. The tall banks of windows flood the living room with natural light. Outside the living room, there are two terraces, one with a view of Hollywood and the other with a view of the hillside. The floor plan forms a T and has large public spaces, each with a fireplace. The dining room and kitchen are on the main floor. The house has  with three bedrooms, a den, three bathrooms, staff wing and a spa. The house was built without a front door, entrance being offered through a rear door, "as if to finalize the metaphor of privacy and retrenchment."  Actually there are five door/window openings in front, being very visually pleasing, but perhaps lacking the definitiveness of "one front door."

The house is built on a steep hillside in the Hollywood Hills at a time when the hills did not have the rich foliage present today. At the time of its construction, Storer House is said to have resembled a Pompeiian villa. Frank Lloyd Wright's son, Lloyd Wright, was both the on-site construction manager and the landscape architect, providing an illusion of a ruin barely visible within its jungle environment.

The Storer House was added to the National Register of Historic Places in 1971 and designated as a Historic-Cultural Landmark (#96) in 1972 by the Los Angeles Cultural Heritage Commission. It was also included in Sydney LeBlanc's book The Architecture Traveler: A Guide to 250 Key 20th Century American Buildings.

An homage to Wright was built in the Hollywood Backlot at Disney's California Adventure Park in Anaheim, California: a textile block restroom and seating area was based on the design of the Storer House.

Wright's textile-block houses

Considered an example of Wright's pre-Columbian or early Modernist architecture, Storer House is one of four textile-block houses he built in Southern California, the others being the Millard House, the Samuel Freeman House and the Ennis House.  The textile-block houses were named for their richly textured brocade-like concrete walls. The style was an experiment by Wright in modular construction that he called the Textile Block System. He sought to develop an inexpensive and simple method of construction that would enable ordinary people to build their own homes with stacked blocks, tied together with steel rods. Writer Hugh Hart has described Wright's concept this way: "By unifying decoration and function, exterior and interior, earth and sky -- perforated blocks served as skylights -- Wright saw his Textile Block Method approach as an utterly modern, and democratic, expression of his organic architecture ideal."

Wright was also intrigued by archaeological discoveries on Mexico's Yucatan Peninsula and used elements from Maya architecture and design in the Storer House. Wright used sledgehammers and aluminum molds to imprint elaborate Maya-inspired patterns into the blocks. The four Southern California textile-block houses represented Wright's earliest uses of the exotic, monumental Maya forms. Storer House is the only one of Wright's textile-block houses to use multiple block patterns—four in all.

Wright's textile block houses did not catch on as he had hoped. As The New York Times later said of the California houses built by Wright in the 1920s: "It didn't help that he was obsessed at the time with an untested and (supposedly) low-cost method of concrete-block construction. What kind of rich person, many wondered, would want to live in such a house? Aside from the free-spirited oil heiress Aline Barnsdall, whom he fought with constantly, his motley clients included a jewelry salesman, a rare-book dealing widow and a failed doctor."

Restoration by Joel Silver

By 1980, the house had fallen into a dilapidated condition. It was put on the market for $1 million in 1981, before being acquired in 1984 for $800,000 by motion picture producer Joel Silver. Silver, who has produced such films as Lethal Weapon, Die Hard and The Matrix, began a restoration project in 1984. The restoration was carried out under the supervision of Wright's grandson, Eric Lloyd Wright, and Martin Eli Weil, past president of the Los Angeles Conservancy. One of the challenges in the restoration effort was to develop a formula to duplicate the structure's concrete blocks. Ultimately, replacement blocks were made using soil from the backyard mixed with cement to conform to Wright's concept of "organic architecture." In addition to restoring the house, Silver also restored the original landscaping and installed a pool that had been planned but not built. Eric Wright worked with Silver in completing elements included in the original plans. The restoration project won awards from the California Council of the American Institute of Architects and the Los Angeles Conservancy. In 2005, The New York Times wrote that the Storer House "is widely considered the best-preserved Wright building in Los Angeles."

Silver put it on the market in 2001 for $3.5 million. After putting "a small fortune" into the restoration and fixing leaky roofs, Silver had difficulty finding a buyer. Reports indicated that a similar home would sell for $1 million, leading Forbes magazine to ask: "Will someone pay a 400% premium to live in a piece of architectural history?  Probably not.  Even immaculately restored, the Storer House still has drawbacks: It's small, the address is just a shade east of swanky Beverly Hills and the other houses on the hills above invade its privacy." Given the landscaping however, the house has great privacy from all of its neighbors. Silver ultimately sold the house in 2002 for $2.9 million. In 2013, the house was listed for sale once more. It sold two years later in February 2015 for a reported $6.8 million.

In popular culture
One of the blocks in the house was used as the Silver Pictures logo from 1991 to 2005, shown at the end of The Matrix Trilogy, Conspiracy Theory, Cradle 2 The Grave, Swordfish, and Romeo Must Die.
In The Venture Brothers, home of Phantom Limb and later the Monarch and Doctor Mrs. the Monarch.
 It is prominently featured in The Rocketeer.

See also
Los Angeles Historic-Cultural Monuments in Hollywood
National Register of Historic Places listings in Los Angeles

References

Storrer, William Allin. The Frank Lloyd Wright Companion. University Of Chicago Press, 2006,  (S.215)

External links

Original architectural drawing of Storer House
Drawings and data pages on the Library of Congress Historic American Buildings Survey

Frank Lloyd Wright buildings
Culture of Hollywood, Los Angeles
Houses completed in 1923
Los Angeles Historic-Cultural Monuments
Houses on the National Register of Historic Places in Los Angeles
Mayan Revival architecture
Modernist architecture in California
Hollywood Hills
Hollywood Boulevard